The Houlgate System, also known as the Deke Houlgate collegiate football rating system, was a mathematical rating system for determining annual college football national championships. The ratings, which rated teams according to the strength of their opponents, were created by Carroll Everard "Deke" Houlgate, Sr., a sports publicist and statistician.  Houlgate used his system to select national champions on a current basis from 1927 to 1958.  He also applied his ratings methodology retroactively to select national champions for each year from 1885 to 1926.  His selections were published in newspapers in the 1930s and 1940s.

The "Houlgate System" is one of the selectors of historic national champions recognized as a major selector by the National Collegiate Athletic Association (NCAA) in its Football Bowl Subdivision record book.

In 1945, Houlgate also initiated his selections for the Futility Bowl matching the two worst college football teams in a fictional football game to be played in Death Valley. His annual picks for the Futility Bowl included: (1) Worcester Polytechnic Institute and College of Wooster in 1945; (2) Kansas State and Carnegie Tech in 1947; (3) Kansas State and Montana State in 1948; (4) BYU and Rhode Island State in 1949; and (5) Davidson and Montana in 1951.

Houlgate also published a book titled "The Football Thesaurus" starting in 1946.

Deke Houlgate was born in Peru, Nebraska, on May 8, 1905.  He graduated from Ventura High School and attended the University of Southern California.  He served in the Air Force during World War II and died at the Wadsworth Veterans Administration Hospital in Los Angeles, California, on July 31, 1959, at age 54.  Houlgate's wife, Dorothy P. Houlgate, was considered "one of the leading feminine football experts" and assisted with the annual football ratings; she died in August 1959, less than a month after the death of her husband.

Houlgate national champions
The following list identifies the college football national champions as selected by the Houlgate System.

See also
NCAA Division I FBS national football championship

References

College football championships
College football awards organizations